Janne Johansson was a Swedish chairman of the Swedish Association football club Malmö FF, a post he held for two periods, first between 1919 and 1921 and then between 1927 and 1928.

References

Swedish sports executives and administrators
Malmö FF chairmen